"Ballerina (Prima Donna)" is a song recorded by English singer-songwriter Steve Harley, released by Stiletto Records as a non-album single in 1983. The song, written and produced by Mike Batt, reached number 51 in the UK Singles Chart.

Background
In 1983, Batt approached Harley with the newly-written "Ballerina (Prima Donna)" and offered him the opportunity to record it. Batt played the song on the piano to Harley and the singer agreed to record it after taking a liking to the song. Harley recorded "Ballerina (Prima Donna)" in the spring of 1983 at Lansdowne Studios and Abbey Road Studios, London, with Batt as the producer. The song was released as a single in June 1983 by Stiletto Records and gave Harley his first UK chart action in four years, peaking at number 51 in the UK Singles Chart and remaining in the top 100 for six weeks.

In an interview on Scotland Today, Harley said about recording the song, "I still write nearly everything I record, but Mike wrote this song, came to me and my record company and said 'I've got this for Steve'. I've known him a few years, never working with him though. And when he sang it to me on the piano, he sang it like me, and I fell for it, I couldn't help it, and so we recorded it."

In 1985, Harley was more dismissive of the song, calling it "crap" and "not really me", and adding, "I needed a hit and I thought [Batt] might be able to supply me with one." Later in 2013, Harley described the song as "a bit cheesy" but added, "It has a bitter, accusing air, written by my good mate Mike Batt at a time of low self-esteem (wouldn't have lasted long!)"

Release
"Ballerina (Prima Donna)" was released by Stiletto Records on 7-inch and 12-inch single in the UK and Germany. RCA handled the single's marketing and distribution. The single's sleeve credited the song solely to Steve Harley, whereas the vinyl credited it to Steve Harley & Cockney Rebel.

The B-side, "Face to Face", written and produced by Harley, is exclusive to the single. The song was written and recorded in the studio as a 16-track demo. Harley recalled in 1985, "That was a demo. We never actually re-recorded it. It [was] written and recorded in about three hours. I wrote it in the studio, and recorded it there and then."

The 12-inch releases of the single included a new version of "Sebastian", which was originally recorded by Cockney Rebel in 1973 for the album The Human Menagerie. The 1983 version was recorded at the suggestion of Batt, who also produced the track. Harley recalled in 1985, "I didn't mind it at all. Mike wanted to do it, and I just said OK. All it strictly is is Mike's interpretation of my song."

Music video
The song's music video was filmed at the Prince Edward Theatre, Old Compton Street, London. It depicts the story of a ballerina performing at a theatre, where her boyfriend (Harley), who was in the audience watching her performance, then catches her with another man backstage afterwards, causing him to confront her in the dressing room. Harley leaves and in distress the ballerina hands back the bouquet of flowers given to her by her secret lover, and tearfully watches Harley's shadow disappear as he leaves down the stairs. Harley leaves the theatre and calls a taxi, while the ballerina sits on an empty stage in sadness. Other segments in the video feature the ballerina performing on stage and close-up shots of Harley singing the song's first two chorus sections. The video was created in similar style to a film and featured opening and ending credits.

Harley said of the video in 1985, "We [did] a really good video which you wouldn't have seen. There's no where you can play a video until [the single]'s in the top 50. It's a very good video, real clever, I liked it a lot. Had it been a hit record, and the video shown often on Top of the Pops and that, I think it would have been an award-winning video."

In 1986, Harley would return to the Prince Edward Theatre, where he auditioned on stage for the role of the phantom in the upcoming Andrew Lloyd-Webber musical The Phantom of the Opera. Although Harley was given the starring role, he was later replaced close to rehearsals by Michael Crawford.

Promotion
Harley appeared on the South West TV show Freeze Frame, where he performed the song. He was accompanied on stage by the 16 year old ballerina Maria Roselli, who made her television debut on the show, performing ballet in the background during the song's performance. Roselli told the Aldershot News & Mail in 1983, "I'm a fan [of Steve Harley]. I didn't really know of him until I heard him, but I thought the song was very nice." During Harley's appearance on Scotland Today, a clip from an alternative music video was shown.

"Ballerina (Prima Donna)" was performed live by Steve Harley & Cockney Rebel on two occasions around the time of its release. The band performed it at their London concert in June 1983 and at the Reading Festival in August 1983. In February 2013, the song received its first live performance in 30 years during the band's concert at Buxton, and the song was also included on select dates during the band's November 2013 tour.

Critical reception
On its release, Simon Mares of the Reading Evening Post wrote, "This song is written, arranged and produced by Mike Batt and I have to say you can just about make out Steve's talent as a singer struggling through - but it's a difficult job and I'd rather hear his self-penned songs." Simon Tebbutt of Record Mirror commented, "The last living survivor of the Titanic disaster with a melodramatic bargain basement Eagles-meets-Metal Mickey type song. Bound to be Terry Wogan's record of the week." Charles Shaar Murray of New Musical Express wrote, "Harley never quite captured Dylan's winge and whimsy as well as Ian Hunter, but his music is now so appallingly dreary that it's quite possible that he could do exceptionally well in the States at last."

Track listing
7-inch single
"Ballerina" – 4:11
"Face to Face" – 3:29

12-inch single
"Ballerina" – 4:57
"Sebastian" – 4:06

Personnel 
Production
 Mike Batt – producer and arranger on "Ballerina" and "Sebastian"
 Steve Harley – producer of "Face to Face"

Other
 BBB Design – 7-inch picture sleeve artwork
 Terry Walker – 7-inch picture sleeve photography
 Amanda Lord at Freddie's – 7-inch picture sleeve model

Charts

References

1983 songs
1983 singles
Steve Harley songs
RCA Records singles
Songs written by Mike Batt
Song recordings produced by Mike Batt